William Garrioch Jr. (July 4, 1828 – February 7, 1916) was a farmer and political figure in Manitoba who served in the Legislative Assembly of Assiniboia.

He was the son of William Garrioch, a native of England, and Nancy Cook, of Métis descent. Around 1851, Garrioch married Mary Brown. They first settled in St. Peter's parish but later moved to St. Mary's la Prairie. He was named a justice of the peace by 1872. In 1872, the family moved to Kinosota on Lake Manitoba.

He died in Westbourne at the age of 87.

References 

1828 births
1916 deaths
Members of the Legislative Assembly of Assiniboia

Canadian Métis people
People from Portage la Prairie